Österland (Eastland) or Österlanden (Easternlands), one of the four traditional lands of Sweden, was a medieval term used for the southern part of Finland. The term occurs in documents approximately between 1350–1470 and gradually fell out of use by the end of the 15th century. Before this period the term was used in plural, Österlanden, Easternlands.

With the exception of Old Finland that was ceded to Russia in 1721, Finland remained a part of Sweden until after the Finnish War of 1808–09, when it was ceded to Russia and came to constitute the autonomous Russian Grand Duchy of Finland.

Provinces 
The following six provinces formed Österland:

History 
Due to the Northern Crusades against Finns, Tavastians and Karelians and the Swedish Colonisation during the 13th century, the Kingdom of Sweden and the Catholic Church incorporated Southern Finland. The details of this process are not known. The conquest took place at the same time or later than Sweden was united under one king; and the Österlanden was seen as a constituent part of the Swedish kingdom. It was first represented in the elections of Swedish kings on 15 February 1362 (when Haakon Magnusson was elected as co-regent of his father).

In the wake of the crusades, possibly thousands of Christian Swedish settlers gradually moved into the western and southern coasts of Österlanden (now Finland) from the 13th century onwards until the 1350s. There is no conclusive archaeological or toponymical proof of Norse-speaking inhabitants in Finland during earlier times outside Åland. Descendants of these settlers became to later known as Finland Swedes.

In 1581, the provinces of the area were declared a grand principality by King John III of Sweden, who as a prince, in 1556, had been granted a part of that territory as a duchy created beside other duchies ruled by his brothers. The creation of that Duchy was chiefly a part of the legacy of King Gustav Vasa. While the Duchy did not last as an administrative unit, the titular grand principality did, for over two centuries and ultimately, after 1809, evolved into an autonomous duchy under the Russian Empire.

Legacy 
Today, the area would comprise roughly ~189000 km2 and 4.9 million people. Österland would comprise most of Finland's regions except the northern regions of 1,2 and 3

See also
Finland under Swedish rule
Historical provinces of Finland
Lands of Sweden
Götaland
Norrland
Svealand
Sweden–Finland

References 

Former provinces of Finland
Lands of Sweden
Finland under Swedish rule